Inches railway station co-served the hamlet of Glespin, South Lanarkshire, Scotland, from 1874 to 1964 on the Muirkirk Branch.

History 
The station was opened on 1 June 1874 by the Caledonian Railway. It was situated on the site of Inches farm, near Monksfoot Bridge. It served a remote area. The hamlet of Glespin was still developing when this station opened. At the east end of the eastbound platform was the signal box and on the north side was the goods yard. In 1903 a branch opened on the west side which served Carmacoup Colliery. The station closed on 5 October 1964.

References 

Disused railway stations in Fife
Former North British Railway stations
Railway stations in Great Britain opened in 1847
Railway stations in Great Britain closed in 1969
1847 establishments in Scotland
1969 disestablishments in Scotland